Syed Haider Abbas Rizvi, (born, January 1, 1968, in Karachi) is the former deputy parliamentary leader of MQM who had been the member of National Assembly of Pakistan from 2008 to 2012. Previously, he served as member of National Assembly of Pakistan from 2002 to 2008.

Education

Rizvi has completed his M.Sc. degree in Applied Chemistry in 1992 from the University of Karachi and M.Sc. Chemical Engineering in 1998 from University of Detroit Mercy, U.S.A. He is an Engineering Management Consultant by profession. He is also qualified as a lead Auditor for ISO 9000, Lead Auditor for ISO 14000 and has attended a wide range of management training courses. He was also a former Director of Pakistan National Shipping Corporation (PNSC).

Political career 
He was first elected to the National Assembly of Pakistan as a candidate of Muttahida Qaumi Movement (MQM) from constituency NA-244 (Karachi-VI) in 2002 Pakistani general election by receiving  by 54,101 votes.

He was re-elected to the National Assembly as a candidate of MQM from constituency NA-253 (Karachi-XV) in 2008 Pakistani general election receiving 96,973 votes.

He resigned from his National Assembly seat in December 2012 due to having dual nationality.

Personal life

Haidar Abbas Rizvi has two sons and two daughters. He has travelled to the Georgia, Tanzania, Estonia and Ivory Coast. His interests include reading Urdu literature, writing Urdu poetry, playing cricket and chess. He is a member of Young Parliamentarians Forum (YPF) Pakistan.

Awards

References 

Living people
1969 births
Muhajir people
Muttahida Qaumi Movement politicians
Pakistani Shia Muslims
Pakistani emigrants to Canada
University of Karachi alumni
University of Detroit Mercy alumni
Politicians from Karachi
Naturalized citizens of Canada